Waipatia is an extinct genus of whale from the late Oligocene (Chattian) of New Zealand.

Taxonomy
The type species, Waipatia maerewhenua is known from a single skull found near 45° South in Otago. The second species, W. hectori, was originally named Microcetus hectori in 1935, but later recognized as distinct from Microcetus. "Uncamentodon" was informally coined for M. hectori in a table by Rothausen in a 1970 paper, but the lack of a diagnosis or description made it a nomen nudum. Finally in 2015, M. hectori was recognized as a second species of Waipatia based on preparation of additional material included in the holotype.

References

Further reading
Marine Mammals: Evolutionary Biology by Annalisa Berta, James L. Sumich, and Kit M. Kovacs
Aquagenesis: The Origin and Evolution of Life in the Sea by Richard Ellis
Wildlife of Gondwana: Dinosaurs and Other Vertebrates from the Ancient Supercontinent (Life of the Past) by Pat Vickers Rich, Thomas Hewitt Rich, Francesco Coffa, and Steven Morton
Marine Mammal Biology: An Evolutionary Approach by A. Rus Hoelzel

Prehistoric toothed whales
Extinct animals of New Zealand
Oligocene cetaceans
Prehistoric vertebrates of Oceania
Prehistoric cetacean genera
Fossil taxa described in 1994